WXCF may refer to:

 WXCF (AM), a radio station (1230 AM) licensed to serve Clifton Forge, Virginia, United States
 WHTU, a radio station (103.9 FM) licensed to serve Big Island, Virginia, which held the call sign WXCF-FM from 1982 to 2012